Scybalium is a genus of flowering plants belonging to the family Balanophoraceae.

Its native range is Caribbean, Western South America to Brazil.

Species:

Scybalium depressum 
Scybalium fungiforme 
Scybalium glaziovii 
Scybalium jamaicense

References

Balanophoraceae
Santalales genera